David Solomon Abwo (born 10 May 1986) is a Nigerian former professional footballer who played as a midfielder.

Career
Abwo was born in Jos, Nigeria.

In December 2010, he joined Polish club Zagłębie Lubin on a half-year loan from Lombard-Pápa TFC.

In 2017 Abwo joined Ceyhanspor.

In January 2018, he moved to KTFF Süper Lig club Çetinkaya Türk S.K. in Northern Cyprus.

References

External links
 
 
 Profile at HLSZ 

1986 births
Living people
Sportspeople from Jos
Nigerian footballers
Association football midfielders
Nigeria under-20 international footballers
Nigeria international footballers
Ligue 2 players
TFF First League players
Enyimba F.C. players
Gençlerbirliği S.K. footballers
Dijon FCO players
US Créteil-Lusitanos players
Lombard-Pápa TFC footballers
Zagłębie Lubin players
Giresunspor footballers
Çetinkaya Türk S.K. players
Nigerian expatriate footballers
Expatriate footballers in Turkey
Nigerian expatriate sportspeople in Turkey
Expatriate footballers in France
Nigerian expatriate sportspeople in France
Expatriate footballers in Hungary
Nigerian expatriate sportspeople in Hungary
Expatriate footballers in Poland
Nigerian expatriate sportspeople in Poland
Expatriate footballers in Northern Cyprus
Nigerian expatriate sportspeople in Northern Cyprus